Pirelli Tires presents the Pacific F2000 Championship is an American open-wheel racing series designed for the entry-level driver and is a part of the Mazda Road to Indy. The Pacific F2000 Racing Series offers 15 racing opportunities over six weekends at leading West Coast venues such as Auto Club Speedway, Buttonwillow Raceway and Thunderhill Raceway. The Pacific F2000 Racing series is designed to be the next step up for F1600 drivers with the introduction of wings, increased power, and larger racing tires. The suspension geometry of a modern F2000 car is as sophisticated as those in many more well known races and offers great training for drivers, engineers and mechanics. Because formula and not spec cars are used there are numerous chassis designs, multiple motors allowed, and as a result there is also great opportunity to test new designs.. At the same time, there are enough restrictions to keep costs in check. F2000 originated in England in 1974 and has helped spawn the careers of many of the sport’s top names. In North America, its alumni include Sam Hornish Jr., Buddy Rice, Paul Tracy, Jimmy Vasser and Dan Wheldon. Graduates of PacificF2000 Racing since its inception in 2004 include J.R. Hildebrand, who won the 2009 Firestone Indy Lights Championship and drives the No. 4 National Guard car in the IZOD IndyCar Series; rising Grand-Am Rolex Sports Car Series star Dane Cameron; and Jason Bowles, who won the 2011 NASCAR Toyota All-Star Showdown at Irwindale Speedway.

Format
Each race weekend consists of 2 separate sets of Practice, Qualifying and Race sessions.

Mazda Road to Indy Shootout
On August 1, 2015 it was announced that Pacific F2000 would be an official partner in the Road to Indy series along with 9 other entry-level race series. Starting in the 2016 season, the champion of the series will gain entry to a shootout against the champions from competing series for the chance to win a $200,000 scholarship and entry in the U.S. F2000 National Championship.

Current Racetracks
Auto Club Speedway
Buttonwillow Raceway Park
Mazda Raceway Laguna Seca
Willow Springs International Motorsports Park

Past Racetracks
Las Vegas Motor Speedway
Miller Motorsports Park
Portland International Raceway
Thunderhill Raceway Park

Alumni
Graduates of Pacific F2000 Racing include J.R. Hildebrand who won the 2009 Firestone Indy Lights Championship and drives the No. 4 National Guard car in the IZOD IndyCar Series; three-time Indy Car winner Colton Herta, son of Champ Car driver Bryan Herta and the youngest driver to win an IndyCar event; rising Grand-Am Rolex Sports Car Series star Dane Cameron; David Chang, co-owner of Jackie Chan racing; 2018 Indy Lights Champion Patricio (Pato) O'Ward; and Jason Bowles, who won the 2011 NASCAR Toyota All-Star Showdown at Irwindale Speedway. Other notables who've raced with the series include tech luminary Bill Kincaid, creator of Apple's I-Tunes; current manager of Buttonwillow Raceway Park Les Phillips, and previous "Best Shoes" winner Peter West.

Past Drivers Champions 

 2004, Brad Jaeger
 2005, Mike Forest
 2006, Robert Podlesni
 2007, Patrick Barrett
 2008, Jeff Westphal
 2009, Robert Podlesni
 2010, Scott Rarick
 2011, Conner Ford
 2012, Bobby Kelley
 2013, Bob Negron
 2014, Andrew Evans
 2015, Tom Hope
 2016, Tim de Silva
 2017, Mitch Egner
 2018, Jason Reichert
 2019, Jason Reichert
 2020, Tom Hope
 2021, Robert Armington
 2022, Troy Shooter

See also
U.S. F2000 National Championship
Formula Ford
F2000 Championship Series

References

External links
Official website

Auto racing series in the United States